Akalangalil is a 1986 Indian Malayalam film, directed by J. Sasikumar and produced by Sasikumar. The film stars Nedumudi Venu and Seema in the lead roles. The film has musical score by Johnson.

Cast
Nedumudi Venu
Seema
Ahalya 
Thilakan 
Mala Aravindan

Soundtrack
The music was composed by Johnson and the lyrics were written by K. Jayakumar.

References

External links
 

1986 films
1980s Malayalam-language films